Ephysteris brachypogon is a moth in the family Gelechiidae. It was described by Edward Meyrick in 1937. It is found in South Africa.

References

Ephysteris
Moths described in 1937